Elaine Murtagh (born Elaine Patricia Murtagh, 1940, County Cork, Ireland) is an Irish singer, songwriter and a member of The Avons, a pop vocal group popular in the 1950s and early 1960s.

Career
Murtagh was a member of The Avons with her sister-in-law, Valerie Murtagh. Towards the end of her singing career she moved into songwriting; the best known of which is "Dance On!", a hit record for both The Shadows in 1962 and Kathy Kirby in 1963, which she wrote with Valerie and Ray Adams. She also wrote "In Summer", a number 5 hit for Billy Fury in 1963, as well as songs recorded by Petula Clark and Tom Jones.

References

1940 births
Living people
Irish women singers
Irish songwriters
Musicians from County Cork